Aniocha North is a Local Government Area of Delta State, Nigeria, with its headquarters in Issele Ukwu. It comprises Igbo speaking people and towns. The  National Youth Service Corps (NYSC) permanent orientation camp for Delta state is located at Issele Ukwu town. 
 
It has a land area of 406.00 km (40,600 hectares or 156.76 sq mi), with an alititude of 259 m (850 ft) above mean-sea level. Aniocha North Local Government Area experiences the Tropical savanna climate based on the Köppen's climate classification (Aw) and has a population of 104,711 according to the 2006 census.

The postal code of the area is 320.

Cities, Towns and Communities

 Anioma
 Ezi
 Idumuje-Ugboko
 Idumuje-Unor
 Idumuogo
 Isa-Ogwashi
 Issele-Azagba
 Issele Uku, LGA headquarters
 Issele-Mkpitime.
 Obior
 Obomkpa
 Onicha Olona
 Onicha-Ugbo
 Onicha-Uku (old name is Onicha-Ukwu)
 Ubulubu
 Ugboba
 Ugbodu
 Ugodor
 Ukwu-Nzu (also known as Ukunzu)

References

 Aniocha North Progressives 

Local Government Areas in Delta State